3,3-Diethyl-2-pyrrolidinone (DEABL) is an anticonvulsant drug most closely related to pyrithyldione and gabapentin. It was found to extend lifespan in the nematode worms Caenorhabditis elegans.

References 

Anticonvulsants
Pyrrolidones
GABAA receptor positive allosteric modulators